Phalonidia campicolana is a species of moth of the family Tortricidae. It is found in the United States, where it has been recorded from California, Washington, Maine and Minnesota.

The length of the forewings is 6.5–8 mm. Adults have been recorded on wing from May to July.

References

Moths described in 1879
Phalonidia